Diego Pérez (born 9 February 1962) is a retired professional tennis player from Uruguay. Pérez turned pro in 1981, and won one ATP Tour singles and three doubles titles in his career, which lasted until 1995.  He has the most singles wins for the Uruguay Davis Cup team (31, shared with Marcelo Filippini).

ATP career finals

Singles (1 win, 1 loss)

Doubles (3 wins, 12 losses)

External links 
 
 
 

1962 births
Living people
Uruguayan male tennis players
Sportspeople from Montevideo
South American Games medalists in tennis
South American Games silver medalists for Uruguay
Competitors at the 1978 Southern Cross Games